Leirfjorden is a fjord in the municipalities of Leirfjord and Alstahaug in Nordland county, Norway. There is a short strait that connects it to the Vefsnfjorden to the south.  

There are two bridges that cross it: Helgeland Bridge in the west and Sundøy Bridge in the south.  The village of Leland lies on the northern coast and the village of Sundøy lies on the southern coast.

See also
 List of Norwegian fjords

References

Fjords of Nordland
Leirfjord